Linguistic Typology is a triannual peer-reviewed academic journal in the field of linguistic typology. It was established in 1997, and is published by Mouton de Gruyter on behalf of the Association for Linguistic Typology. The editor-in-chief was Frans Plank until 2018, and is now Maria Koptjevskaja-Tamm (University of Stockholm).

Abstracting and indexing

According to the Journal Citation Reports, the journal has a 2015 impact factor of 0.455.

References

External links

Linguistics journals
Works on linguistic typology
Publications established in 1997
English-language journals
De Gruyter academic journals
Triannual journals